Three Seats for the 26th is a 1988 French romantic musical film, scripted and directed by Jacques Demy to music by Michel Legrand.  Set in Marseille, it shows the singer and actor Yves Montand returning to the city where he grew up and looking up old friends, including his first love Mylène, who had been a prostitute and is now the wife of a jailed baron. The purpose of his visit is to rehearse a stage musical based on his life, where the female lead he falls in love with is Marion, the daughter Mylène had after they parted. It was Demy's last picture.

Plot 
The film opens with the famous singer and actor Yves Montand arriving in Marseille, where he grew up, to rehearse a new musical based on his life. From his years as an unknown, including the loss of his first great love, the show moves on to his artistic and amorous links with great stars like Édith Piaf and Marilyn Monroe.

In his free time he looks up old friends, hoping in particular to find Mylène, his first love who worked as a prostitute. At his hotel, a card is left by the Baroness de Lambert, who asks to see him. While in his dressing room, he is entranced by a fan called Marion, who asks him for three seats on the 26th so that she and the two girls she works with can attend the sold-out opening night. Though trained in acting, song and dance, she works in a perfume shop.

When the leading lady has to leave the cast because of pregnancy, Marion volunteers and is hired. When Yves rings up the mysterious baroness, he recognises from her voice that she is Mylène and the two have a tender reunion in the bar where they first met. She is living with the daughter she had after they parted but will lose her home, since her husband has been sent to prison for five years.

The opening is a great success and the show is booked to run in Paris. Marion spends the night with Yves and, as they talk about each other's lives over breakfast, she realises that she is his daughter. Unshaken in her love for him, she goes home to get her mother. The two women he has loved most in his life then join Yves on the train to Paris.

Cast 
 Yves Montand : Yves Montand
 Mathilda May : Marion de Lambert
 Françoise Fabian : Marie-Hélène, Baroness de Lambert (formerly Mylène Le Goff)
 Jean-Claude Bouillaud : the captain
 Antoine Bourseiller : Fonteneau
 Christophe Bourseiller : Serge
 Geoffrey Carey : Michael
 Sophie Castel : receptionist
 Katy Varda : Alice
 Marie-Dominique Chayze : Nicole
 Raoul Curet : hotel manager
 Mathieu Demy : Derderian
 Danielle Durou : Miss Destain
 Patrick Fierry : Toni Fontaine
 Paul Guers : Max Leehman
 Bertrand Lacy : Steve Larsenal
 Catriona MacColl : Betty Miller
 Pierre Maguelon : Marius Ceredo
 Christiane Minazzoli : Mrs Simonot
 Carlo Nell : Berlingot
 Jacques Nolot : Marcel Amy

Reception 
For the reviewer of Le Monde, after the dark tragic passion of  Une chambre en ville Demy returns with this final film to love as the supreme force in his art. Love in this case not only surmounts the age gap between Montand and his unknown daughter Marion but also survives the discovery that the two have unknowingly committed incest. Her sexual power over Montand is not idealised or ambiguous but in a bold and surprising fashion goes hand in hand with the feelings the two have for each other. Strong though her hold over Montand seems, her still very attractive mother exerts an even greater pull.

Notes and references

External links 

1980s musical films
1988 films
Films directed by Jacques Demy
Films set in Marseille
French musical drama films
Incest in film
Films about actors
Films about singers
Films about nobility